Lucas Mascarenhas Santana (born October 18, 1970), known as his stage name Lucas Santtana, is a Brazilian singer, composer and producer from Salvador, Bahia, Brazil.
In his CD, Sem Nostalgia (YB Music, 2009), he recreates the Brazilian guitar tradition, mixing up sounds from the 1950s, like João Gilberto and Dorival Caymmi, with mashups, samples and his own creations.

His album O Céu É Velho Há Muito Tempo was considered one of the 25 best Brazilian albums of the second half of 2019 by the São Paulo Association of Art Critics.

References

External links 
 Lucas Santtana Official Website
 Lucas Santtana on facebook
 Lucas Santtana on Twitter

1970 births
Living people
21st-century Brazilian male singers
21st-century Brazilian singers
Brazilian composers
Brazilian record producers
People from Salvador, Bahia